Tianjin North railway station is a station in Hebei District, Tianjin on the Tianjin–Shanhaiguan Railway. The station opened in 1903 and was closed for renovation between April 1, 2014 to April 30, 2015 and reopened accepting regional rail services to Jizhou. The Beijing–Tianjin intercity railway passes beside the station but does not stop in it. Connections are available to Tianjin Metro Line 3 and Line 6 via Beizhan Station.

See also 
 Transport in Tianjin
 Tianjin West Station
 Tianjin railway station

Notes and references 

Railway stations in Tianjin
Railway stations in China opened in 1903